Milillo is a surname. Notable people with this surname include:

 Alessio Milillo (born 1997), Italian football player
 Valeria Milillo (born 1966), Italian actress
  (born 1966), Italian politician in Legislature I of Italy, et al.

See also 
 Melillo

it:Milillo